Germany were present at the Eurovision Song Contest 1998, held in Birmingham, United Kingdom.

Before Eurovision

Originally, Germany was relegated from the contest because of its low average score over the previous four years, however after Italy withdrew from the contest, Germany was allowed to compete.

Countdown Grand Prix 1998 
The national final to select their entry, Countdown Grand Prix 1998, was held on 26 February 1998 at the Stadthalle Bremen, and was hosted by Axel Bulthaupt and Nena. The final decision was decided on televoting only; the top 3 were announced, but the other placings are known unofficially. The winning entry was "Guildo hat euch lieb!," performed by Guildo Horn and written and composed by Stefan Raab (under the pseudonym "Alf Igel").

At Eurovision
Heading into the final of the contest, BBC reported that bookmakers ranked the entry 8th out of the 25 entries. Horn was the ninth performer on the night of the Contest, following Israel and preceding Malta. At the Contest, he performed together with his band Die Orthopädischen Strümpfe. At the close of the voting the song had received 86 points, placing 7th in a field of 25 competing countries.

Voting

References

External links
German National Final 1998

1998
Countries in the Eurovision Song Contest 1998
Eurovision
Eurovision